The Montgomery–Janes–Whittaker House, best known today as Buena Vista, is a historic Federal style plantation house in Autauga County, Alabama, south of Prattville. It was listed on the National Register of Historic Places on October 25, 1974.  The house is currently owned by the Autauga County Heritage Association and operated as a historic house museum.

History
Construction of the house was started in 1822 by one of the first landowners, John W. Freeman or Josiah Huie.  It was completed by the next owner, William Montgomery, in 1844.  Mary Emma Scott Stewart purchased the property in 1910 from the Montgomery family.  Jacob Janes then owned the house for two years before it was sold to the Fred Whittaker family in 1937.  The Whittaker family restored and added modern amenities to the house.  They owned it until 1978, when the house was inherited by M.W. Petrey, Jr.  It was sold again in 1982 to the Union Camp Corporation, a pulp and paper company that allowed the Autauga County Heritage Association to preserve and maintain the house.  Following Union Camp's acquisition by International Paper, the new owner donated the house to the association in 2007.

Architecture
Original exterior details of the -story frame house include delicately built fanlights over the front doors and in the side gable ends.  The interior features elaborate plasterwork and a spiral mahogany staircase that ascends from the ground floor to the third floor attic.  A monumental Ionic portico was added to the front facade of the house during the Colonial Revival period by the Stewart family.  The Whittaker family changed the front portico floor from wood to brick and added cast iron to the existing second floor balcony during their restoration efforts.

See also
National Register of Historic Places listings in Autauga County, Alabama

References

External links

Houses on the National Register of Historic Places in Alabama
Federal architecture in Alabama
Colonial Revival architecture in Alabama
Houses completed in 1844
National Register of Historic Places in Autauga County, Alabama
Plantation houses in Alabama
Historic house museums in Alabama
Museums in Autauga County, Alabama
Historic American Buildings Survey in Alabama
Houses in Autauga County, Alabama